A rafter is a structural member to support a roof deck.

Rafter may also refer to:

 Rafter, someone employed in timber rafting, i.e. the floating of timber rafts down rivers from forests to the woodyards
 Balseros (rafters), the name given to persons who emigrate in self constructed or precarious vessels from Cuba to neighbouring states
 Rafter J Ranch, Wyoming, a census-designated place in Teton County, Wyoming, United States
 Operation RAFTER, a MI5 radio receiver detection technique

In culture:
 Rafters (nightclub), a nightclub in Manchester, UK
 Rafter Romance, a 1933 RKO comedy/romance film
 Packed to the Rafters, an Australian family-oriented comedy-drama television series, 2008
 Spoon and Rafter, the fourth album by the British country rock-folk group Mojave 3, 2003
 Blue Rafters, the edition from DC Comics which protagonist is Klarion the Witch Boy
 Rafter (band), a rock band of San Diego, U.S.
 The Rafters Restaurant, opened by Jack Flavell near Wolverhampton, Wales, UK
 Rafters, a New Jersey off-price women's clothing store chain of Reynolds Brothers

In sport:
 Pat Rafter Arena, a Queensland Tennis Centre court named in honour Patrick Rafter
 Surprise Rafters, a baseball team of Surprise, Arizona, U.S.
 Wisconsin Rapids Rafters, a baseball team of Wisconsin Rapids, Wisconsin, U.S.
 Orange River Rafters, South Africa field hockey club

People:
 Rafter (name), a given name and surname
 Patrick Rafter, an Australian tennis player

See also
 Rafting (disambiguation)